ICN may refer to:

Organizations 
 ICN Pharmaceuticals or ICN Radiochemicals, now Valeant Pharmaceuticals, a Canadian multinational
 ICN Radio, an Italian-language radio in New York City
 Information Communications Network LLC, a company in Mongolia
 Inside Climate News, American news organization
 International Competition Network a regulators association
 International Council of Nurses, a federation of national nursing associations
 Iowa Communications Network, an Iowa state agency

Educational institutes 
 ICN Graduate Business School, a French graduate business school in Nancy
 UCL Institute of Cognitive Neuroscience, a group of physicians and scientists at University College London

Computing and communication technology 
 iCN GPS, a range of GPS navigation products from Navman
 Illinois Century Network, an operation by the Illinois Department of Central Management Services
 Information-centric networking
 Integrated Computing Network, maintained by the Los Alamos National Laboratory

History 
 Imperial Chinese Navy, a navy of China from 1875 until the end of Qing Empire in 1912

Science and medicine 
 Inclusion conjunctivitis of the newborn, in medicine
 Intensive care nursery, alternative name for Neonatal intensive care unit
 International Code of Nomenclature for algae, fungi, and plants, in botany
 Iodine cyanide, a pseudohalogen with formula ICN or CNI

Transportation 
 ICN (SBB-CFF-FFS), a Swiss intercity tilting passenger train
 Incheon International Airport, near Seoul, South Korea (by IATA airport code)
 InterCity Nagibni, or RegioSwinger, a Croatian tilting diesel passenger train

Other 
 Indigenous Corporation Number, as registered by the Office of the Registrar of Indigenous Corporations in Australia
 International Communications Network, former name of now-defunct National Broadcasting Network (Trinidad and Tobago)